This is a list of Austrian football transfers for the 2017–18 winter transfer window by club. Only transfers of clubs in the Austrian Football Bundesliga are included.

Austrian Football Bundesliga

Admira Wacker Mödling

In:

Out:

Austria Wien

In:

Out:

LASK Linz

In:

Out:

Rapid Wien

In:

Out:

Red Bull Salzburg

In:

Out:

Rheindorf Altach

In:

Out:

St. Pölten

In:

Out:

Sturm Graz

In:

Out:

SV Mattersburg

In:

Out:

Wolfsberger AC

In:

Out:

References

External links
 Official site of the ÖFB
 Official site of the Bundesliga

Football transfers winter 2017–18
Transfers
2017–18